Many of notable people were either born or adopted in the Swiss city of Zürich.

Native people from Zürich
The following were born or adopted in Zürich. Some became famous after they moved away.

A to D 
 Grand Duchess Maria Alexandrovna of Russia (1853–1920 in Zürich), the fifth child and only surviving daughter of Alexander II of Russia
 Jost Amman (1539 in Zürich – 1591) artist, chiefly of woodcuts.
 Hans Asper (ca.1499 in Zürich – 1571 in Zürich) a painter of portraits.
 Richard Avenarius (1843–1896 in Zürich), philosopher.
 Johann Georg Baiter (1801 in Zürich – 1877) philologist and textual critic.
 Daniel Barben (born 1961 in Zürich), university professor
 Denise Biellman (born 1962 in Zürich), Olympic figure skater, eponym of her skating spin
 Diego Benaglio (born 1983 in Zürich), footballer 
 Severin Blindenbacher (born 1983 in Zürich), ice hockey player
 Felix Bloch (1905 in Zürich – 1983), physicist
 Johann Jakob Bodmer (1698 at Greifensee – 1783 in Zürich) author, academic and poet.
 Rosa Bloch-Bollag (1880 in Zürich – 1922), political activist
 Johann Kaspar Bluntschli (1808 in Zürich – 1881) a jurist and politician.
 Alain de Botton (1969 in Zürich), British philosopher and author
 Celeste Buckingham (born 1995 in Zürich), Slovak singer 
 Heinrich Bullinger (1504–1575 in Zürich), reformer and theologian.
 René Burri (1933 in Zürich – 2014 in Zürich), photographer
 Elias Canetti (1905–1994 in Zürich), novelist
 Monika Dettwiler (born 1948 in Zürich), journalist and author
 Fabio Digenti (born 1983 in Zürich), footballer
 Gottlieb Duttweiler (1888–1962 in Rüschlikon), entrepreneur and politician (founder of  Migros)
 Ulla E. Dydo (1925 in Zürich – 2017), writer, editor and noted Gertrude Stein expert

E to G 

 Jeanne Eder-Schwyzer (1894–1957 in Zürich), women's rights activist, President of the International Council of Women
 Nico Elvedi (1996 in Zurich) footballer, plays for Borussia Mönchengladbach
 Alfred Escher (1819 in Zürich – 1882 in Zürich), politician, business leader and railways pioneer
 Lydia Escher (1858 in Zürich-Enge – 1891), daughter of Alfred Escher, founded the Gottfried Keller Stiftung
 Arnold Escher von der Linth (1807 in Zürich – 1872) a geologist.
 Ernst Moritz Ludwig Ettmüller (1802 – 1877 in Zürich), a German philologist. 
 Wilhelm Filchner (1877–1957 in Zürich), explorer
 Peter Fischli (born 1952 in Zürich), artist, part of artistic duo Fischli and Weiss
 Robert Frank (1924 in Zürich - 2019), photographer and documentary filmmaker
 Max Frisch (1911 in Zürich – 1991 in Zürich), major Swiss playwright and novelist
 Christoph Froschauer (ca.1490/–1564 in Zürich), printer of the Froschauer Bible
 Henry Fuseli (1741 in Zürich – 1825 in London) a painter, draughtsman and writer on art.
 Daniel Garbade (born 1957 in Zürich), painter, illustrator, art director and publisher
 Bruno Ganz (1941 in Zürich – 2019), Swiss actor known for playing Adolf Hitler in Downfall
 Patrick Geering (born 1990 in Zürich), ice hockey player
 Ueli Gegenschatz (1971–2009 in Zürich), Swiss BASE jumper, died after a failed jump from the Sunrise Tower
 Conrad Gessner (1516 in Zürich – 1565 in Zürich), naturalist.
 Salomon Gessner (1730 in Zürich – 1788) painter, graphic artist and poet of Idylls.
 HR Giger (1940 – 2014 in Zürich), artist, designer of the Alien aliens
 Hermann Goetz (1840 – 1876 in Zürich) a German composer, wrote the 1872 opera Der Widerspänstigen Zähmung.
 Marcel Grossmann (1878–1936 in Zürich), mathematician

H to K 

 Markus Hediger (born 1959 in Zurich), poet and translator
 Albert Heim (1849 in Zürich – 1937) a geologist.
 Max Holzmann (1899 in Zürich – 1994 in Zürich), cardiologist
 Johann Heinrich Hottinger (1620 in Zürich – 1667) a philologist and theologian.
 Andy Hug (1964 in Zürich – 2000), karateka and kickboxer
 Otto Hunziker (1873 in Zürich – 1959), pioneer in the international dairy industry
 Hans-Ulrich Indermaur (born 1939 in Zürich), magazine editor, TV reporter and author.
 Philippe Jordan (born 1974 in Zürich), Music Director of the Opéra National de Paris, and current chief conductor of the Vienna Symphony Orchestra
 James Joyce (1882–1941 in Zürich), Irish novelist, (buried at Fluntern Cemetery in Zürich)
 Leo Jud (1482 – 1542 in Zürich), a reformer who worked with Huldrych Zwingli in Zürich.
 Carl Jung (1875 in Zürich – 1961 in Zürich), psychiatrist
 Enes Kanter Freedom (born 1992 in Zürich), American basketball player
 Raynold Kaufgetz (1797 in Zürich – 1869 in Zürich), economist
 Gottfried Keller (1819 in Zürich – 1890 in Zürich), poet.
 Otto Klemperer (1885–1973 in Zürich), German conductor (buried at Israelitischer Friedhof Oberer Friesenberg)
 Hugo Koblet (1925 in Zürich – 1964), cycling champion
 Ursula Koch (born 1941 in Zürich), politician
 Albert von Kölliker (1817 in Zürich – 1905) an anatomist, physiologist and histologist.
 Ernesto Korrodi (born Ernst Korrodi) (1870 in Zürich – 1944), architect who lived, worked and died in Portugal

L to R 

 Johann Kaspar Lavater (1741 in Zürich – 1801), poet and physiognomist.
 Antonio Ligabue (1899 in Zürich – 1965), Italian painter
 Hugo Loetscher (1929 in Zürich – 2009 in Zürich), writer
 Rolf Lyssy (born 1936 in Zürich), screenwriter and film director
 Erika Mann (1905 – 1969 in Zurich), German actress, cabaretist and novelist
 Thomas Mann (1875 – 1955 in Zurich), German novelist, exilant in Zürich during WWII.
 Mason McTavish (born 2003 in Zurich), Canadian ice hockey player for the Anaheim Ducks of the NHL.
 Dieter Meier (born 1945 in Zürich), conceptual artist and musician with electronica group Yello
 Conrad Ferdinand Meyer (1825 in Zürich – 1898), poet.
 Silvio Moser, (1941 in Zurich – 1974), a racing driver, died from accident during a race in Monza
 Walter Andreas Müller (born 1945 in Zürich), actor and comedian
 Harald Naegeli (born 1939 in Zürich), artist, renowned as "Sprayer von Zürich"
 Ernst Nobs (1886–1957), trade unionist, politician and mayor of Zürich, 1942 to 1944.
 Hans Konrad von Orelli (1846 in Zürich - 1912) a theologian.
 Johann Caspar von Orelli (1787 in Zürich – 1849), a classical scholar.
 Wolfgang Pauli (1900–1958 in Zürich), physicist
 Johann Heinrich Pestalozzi (1746 in Zürich – 1827), educational reformer.
 Joachim Raff (1822 in Lachen – 1882) a German-Swiss composer and pianist.

S to Z 

 James Sadleir (ca.1815–1881 in Zürich), fugitive swindler, murdered in Zürich
 Johann Jakob Scheuchzer (1672 in Zürich – 1733), scholar.
 Hanna Scheuring (1965 in Zürich), actress and theatre director
 Roland Scholl (1865 in Zürich – 1945), chemist
 Trudi Schoop (1904 in Zürich – 1999), comedy dancer and therapist
 Peter Schweri (1939–2016 in Zürich), artist, illustrator, musician, lived over 20 years in Villa Egli 
 Jonas Siegenthaler (born 1997 in Zürich), ice hockey player
 Nadja Sieger (born 1967 in Zürich), comedian (Ursus & Nadeschkin) raised in Zürich
 Johanna Spyri (1827–1901 in Zürich), author of Heidi
 Tobias Stephan (born 1984 in Zürich), ice hockey player
 Sandra Studer (born 1969 in Zürich), Swiss moderator and singer
 Stefi Talman (born 1958 in Zürich), Swiss shoe designer
 King Tribhuvan Shah (1906–1955 in Zürich), King of Nepal
 Bénédict Turrettini (1588 in Zürich – 1631), an ordained a pastor and professor of theology.
 Shefqet Vërlaci (1877–1946 in Zürich), 12th Prime Minister of Albanian Kingdom (1939–1943)
 Pancho Vladigerov (1899 in Zürich – 1978), Bulgarian composer
 Max Weber (1897–1974), trade unionist and politician, member of the Swiss Federal Council)
 Ernst Ulrich von Weizsäcker (born 1939 in Zurich), German politician and scientist
 Hermann Weyl (1885–1955 in Zurich), mathematician
 Urs Widmer (1938 – 2014 in Zurich), novelist, playwright, essayist and a short story writer.
 Heidi Wunderli-Allenspach (born 1947), Swiss biologist and first women rector of ETH Zurich
 Ozan Yildirim (born 1992 in Zurich), known as OZ, record producer
 Katharina von Zimmern (1478–1547 in Neumarkt), last abbess of the Fraumünster Abbey

Famous residents

A to K 
 Sibylle Berg (1962 in Weimar), German novelist and essayist
 Max Bill (1908 in Winterthur– 1994 in Berlin), Swiss architect, designer and member of the Swiss National Council
 Anne-Marie Blanc (1919 in Vevey– 2009 in Zurich), Swiss actress
 Boris Blank, (born 1952) musician with Yello
 Georg Büchner (1813 – 1837 in Zurich), German revolutionary, dramatist, writer and physician
 Johann Gottfried Ebel (1764–1830) author of the first guidebook to Switzerland, lived in Zurich from 1810.
 Albert Einstein (1879 in Ulm – 1955) lived in Zurich, 1896–1900, 1909–1911, 1912–1914.
 Stephanie Glaser (1920 in Neuchâtel– 2011 in Zollikerberg), Swiss actress, lived in Zürich-Witikon
 Hermann Greulich (1842 in Breslau– 1925 in Zurich), politician, founder of the first Social Party in Switzerland
 Franz Hohler (born 1943 in Biel), Swiss novelist, cabaretist and songwriter
 Udo Jürgens, (1934–2014) an Austrian composer and singer of popular music
 Patricia Kaas, (born 1966) a French singer and actress.
 Jonas Kaufmann, (born 1969) a German operatic tenor. 
 Adolf Keller (1872–1963) Swiss Protestant theologian and writer
 Tina Keller-Jenny (1887–1985) Swiss physician and Jungian psychotherapist
 Erich Kleiber (1890–1956 in Zürich), an Austrian, later Argentine, conductor

L to Z 
 Vladimir Lenin [1870–1924), travelled to Russia from Zürich in 1917.
 Moritz Leuenberger (born 1946 in Biel), Swiss politician, member of the Swiss Federal Council)
 Mileva Maric, (1875 – 1948 in Zürich), Serbian mathematician, first wife of Albert Einstein
 Alina Popa, (born 1978) a Romanian-born professional female bodybuilder
 Manuel Rivera-Ortiz (born 1968) a stateside Puerto Rican photographer.
 Elisabeth von Rapperswil (ca.1251 – 1309 in Rapperswil), Burgrecht of Zürich, last Countess of the House of Rapperswil
 Roger Sablonier (1941–2010), historian and writer of non-fiction publications
 Ernst Sieber (1927–2018), pastor, member of the Swiss National Council, worked with the homeless and drug addicts.
 Lee 'Scratch' Perry (born 1936), reggae and dub producer and singer.
 Kurt Tucholsky (1890–1935) German journalist, satirist and writer, lived in Zürich, 1932–1933
 Tina Turner (born 1939), singer, dancer, actress and composer of American origin and naturalized Swiss
 Tristan Tzara (1896–1963), a Romanian and French avant-garde poet, essayist and performance artist.
 Georg von Vollmar (1850–1922) a Bavarian democratic socialist politician, lived in Zürich 1879 to 1882.
 Richard Wagner (1813–1883) a German composer and conductor, lived in Zürich, 1849–1861.

See also 
 List of mayors of Zürich

References

External links 
 Prominente Verstorbene on stadt-zuerich.ch 

Zurich
people
 
Culture of Zürich
History of Zürich
Zurich